Willis Way is a stop on the Region of Waterloo's Ion rapid transit system. It is located on Caroline Street in Waterloo, at Willis Way. It opened in 2019.

Buses passing southbound on Caroline Street are served by the station platform, opposite the rail side.

Access to the platform is from the west side of Caroline only, on the north end of the platform; at the south end there is a crosswalk to access both sides of the road.

The station's feature wall consists of black, grey, and white glass tiles in a pattern.

The station is centrally located in Waterloo's central business district, known as Uptown. Just north of the station is the Shops at Waterloo Square shopping mall; other nearby institutions include the Centre for International Governance Innovation, the Canadian Clay and Glass Gallery, and the Perimeter Institute for Theoretical Physics. In late 2020, a cycling facility including covered parking and a repair station was installed just west of the station.

References

External links

 

Ion light rail stations
Railway stations in Waterloo, Ontario
2019 establishments in Ontario